Warped Roadies is an American reality television series that was premiered on Fuse on December 7, 2012. The show follows the road crew behind the scenes on the Warped Tour.

Fuse (TV channel) original programming